The 1954 All-Ireland Senior Camogie Championship was the high point of the 1954 season in Camogie. The championship was won by Dublin who defeated first time finalists Derry by an 18-point margin in the final.

Final
Una O'Connor, Sophie Brack and Sheila Sleator shared ten goals. Rose McAllister, Patsy McCloskey, Anna Bryson and Patsy O'Brien scored Derry goals. The Irish Press noted:
One of the biggest crowds ever turned up at Croke Park on Sunday evening last to see the All Ireland camogie final in which Dublin won the title for the seventh successive year. The Derry girls put up a splendid fight and were rather better than the score suggests, but they were unable to match the stickwork and combination of the more experienced Dublin line-out. Derry did well at the start but could not turn their early advantage into scores and when Dublin settled into their stride they advanced steadily to victory. Dublin led by 6-1 to nil at half-time. There was only one free in the entire game.

Final stages

 
MATCH RULES
50 minutes
Replay if scores level
Maximum of 3 substitutions

See also
 All-Ireland Senior Hurling Championship
 Wikipedia List of Camogie players
 National Camogie League
 Camogie All Stars Awards
 Ashbourne Cup

References

External links
 Camogie Association
 Historical reports of All Ireland finals
 All-Ireland Senior Camogie Championship: Roll of Honour
 Camogie on facebook
 Camogie on GAA Oral History Project

All-Ireland Senior Camogie Championship
1954
All-Ireland Senior Camogie Championship